William Heygate may refer to:
 Sir William Heygate, 1st Baronet, British member of parliament
 William Unwin Heygate, British member of parliament